Korea is a 1952 Philippine war film about the Korean War directed by Lamberto V. Avellana. Produced by LVN Pictures, the film is considered to be lost. Benigno Aquino Jr. wrote the script who based it on his experiences on the war as a correspondent.

References

External links

1952 films
1952 drama films
1950s war drama films
Films directed by Lamberto V. Avellana
Korean War films
Lost Philippine films
Lost war drama films
Philippine war drama films
1950s lost films
Philippine black-and-white films